The Deauville American Film Festival is a yearly film festival devoted to American cinema, which has taken place since 1975 in Deauville, France.

It was established by Lionel Chouchan, André Halimi, and then Mayor of Deauville Michel d'Ornano, with support from the Groupe Lucien Barrière in providing a luxurious setting for the Festival. Although not competitive at its origin, the festival began to award prizes for feature films in 1995 and short films in 1998.

Awards

Grand Prix
This award was named Grand Prix spécial Deauville from 1995 to 2007 and Grand Prix du cinéma indépendant américain in 1998 and 1999.

Prix du Jury
The award was called Prix du jury spécial Deauville (Special Deauville Jury Award) from 1995 through 1997 and Prix spécial du jury du cinéma indépendant américain (Special Jury Award of American Independent Film) in 1998 and 1999.

1995 (tied): 
Denise Calls Up directed by Hal Salwen
The Brothers McMullen directed by Edward Burns
1996 (tied):
Bound directed by The Wachowskis
Welcome to the Dollhouse directed by Todd Solondz
1997 (tied):
In the Company of Men directed by Neil LaBute
Ulee's Gold directed by Victor Nuñez
1998: High Art directed by Lisa Cholodenko
1999 (tied): 
Twin Falls Idaho directed by Michael Polish
Guinevere directed by Audrey Wells
2000 (tied): 
Memento directed by Christopher Nolan
Boiler Room directed by Ben Younger
2001: Ghost World directed by Terry Zwigoff
2002 (tied):
One Hour Photo directed by Mark Romanek
L.I.E. directed by Michael Cuesta
2003: Thirteen directed by Catherine Hardwicke
2004: The Woodsman directed by Nicole Kassell
2005 (tied): 
On the Outs directed by Lori Silverbush and Michael Skolnik
Keane directed by Lodge Kerrigan
2006: Half Nelson directed by Ryan Fleck
2007: Never Forever directed by Gina Kim
2008: Ballast directed by Lance Hammer
2009: Precious directed by Lee Daniels
2010 (tied): 
Winter's Bone directed by Debra Granik
The Myth of the American Sleepover directed by David Robert Mitchell
2011: The Dynamiter, directed by Matthew Gordon
2012: Una Noche, directed by Lucy Mulloy
2013 (tied):
All Is Lost directed by J. C. Chandor 
Stand Clear of the Closing Doors directed by Sam Fleischner
2014: The Good Lie directed by Philippe Falardeau
2015: Tangerine directed by Sean Baker
2016 (tied): 
Captain Fantastic directed by Matt Ross
Wiener-Dog directed by Todd Solondz
 2017: (tied) 
 A Ghost Story directed by David Lowery
 Menashe directed by Joshua Z Weinstein
2020 (tied): 
First Cow directed by Kelly Reichardt
Lorelei directed by Sabrina Doyle
2021 (tied):
Red Rocket directed by Sean Baker
Pleasure directed by Ninja Thyberg
2022 (tied):
War Pony directed by Gina Gammell and Riley Keough
Palm Trees and Power Lines directed by Jamie Dack

Prix du Public
The winner of the Deauville Audience Award is chosen by the festival attendees.

1989: Torch Song Trilogy by Paul Bogart
1990 (ex-æquo): 
Pump Up the Volume by Allan Moyle 
Tune in Tomorrow by Jon Amiel
1991 (ex-æquo): 
Trust by Hal Hartley 
Hangin' with the Homeboys by Joseph B. Vasquez
1992: In the Soup by Alexandre Rockwell
1993 (ex-æquo):
El Mariachi by Robert Rodriguez
Naked in New York by Daniel Algrant
Hold Me, Thrill Me, Kiss Me by Joel Hershman
1994 (ex-æquo): 
Go Fish by Rose Troche 
Clerks by Kevin Smith
1995: Living in Oblivion by Tom DiCillo
1997: The Myth of Fingerprints by Bart Freundlich
1998: Next Stop Wonderland by Brad Anderson
2000: Songcatcher by Maggie Greenwald
2001: Jump Tomorrow by Joel Hopkins
2002: One Hour Photo by Mark Romanek
2003: Dot the i by Matthew Parkhill
2004: Maria Full of Grace by Joshua Marston
2013: Fruitvale Station by Ryan Coogler
2014: Whiplash by Damien Chazelle
2015: Dope by Rick Famuyiwa
2016: Captain Fantastic by Matt Ross
2017: Gifted by Marc Webb
2020: Uncle Franck by Alan Ball
2022: Emily the Criminal by John Patton Ford

Prix de la Critique Internationale 
The International Critics' prize is an award presented at the festival.

1987: Hollywood Shuffle by Robert Townsend
1988: Patti Rocks by David Burton Morris
1989: Signs of Life by John David Coles
1990 (ex-æquo):
Metropolitan by Whit Stillman 
Tune in Tomorrow by Jon Amiel
1991: My Own Private Idaho by Gus Van Sant
1992: Gas Food Lodging by Allison Anders
1993 (ex-æquo): 
Public Access by Bryan Singer 
The Wedding Banquet by Ang Lee
1994 (ex-æquo): 
Federal Hill by Michael Corrente
Little Odessa by James Gray
1995: Swimming with Sharks by George Huang
1996: Bound by The Wachowskis
1997: Sunday by Jonathan Nossiter
1998: Gods and Monsters by Bill Condon
1999: Being John Malkovich by Spike Jonze
2000: Memento by Christopher Nolan
2001: Hedwig and the Angry Inch by John Cameron Mitchell
2002: The Safety of Objects by Rose Troche
2003: American Splendor by Shari Springer Berman and Robert Pulcini
2004: Maria Full of Grace by Joshua Marston
2005: Keane by Lodge Kerrigan
2006: Sherrybaby by Laurie Collyer
2007: Grace Is Gone by James C. Strouse
2008: Gardens of the Night by Damian Harris
2009: The Messenger by Oren Moverman
2010: Buried by Rodrigo Cortés
2011: Detachment by Tony Kaye
2012: The We and the I by Michel Gondry
2013: The Retrieval by Chris Eska
2014: It Follows by David Robert Mitchell
2015: Krisha by Trey Edward Schultz
2016: The Fits by Anna Rose Holmer
2017: A Ghost Story by David Lowery
2020 : The Nest by Sean Durkin
2021: Red Rocket directed by Sean Baker
2022: Aftersun directed by Charlotte Wells

Prix d'Ornano-Valenti 
The Prix d'Ornano-Valenti (previously "Prix Michel d'Ornano") is awarded annually to a debut French film. It carries a grant of 3,000 euros for the awarded director-writer, 3,000 euros for the film's producer, and 10,000 euros for the French distributor to help promote the film. The award, which is named in honour of the former Mayor of Deauville and co-founder of the festival, Michel d'Ornano, is supported by the Franco-American Cultural Fund.

1992: Claire Aziza for Les Aiguilleurs
1993: Hélène Woillot for Quand j'ai vu la chimère
1994: Marie-Hélène Saller for Les Leçons du Mardi
1995: Gilles Malençon for Le Bout du fleuve
1996 (ex-æquo): 
Christophe Mordellet for Silhouette 
Éric Vernhes for Le Grand Projet
1997: Gilles Malençon for L'Élue
1998: Siegfried for Louise (Take 2)
1999: Stéphane Brizé and Florence Vignon for Le Bleu des villes
2000: Virginie Wagon and Érick Zonca for Le Secret
2001: Gilles Paquet-Brenner for Pretty Things
2002: Claude Duty for Filles perdues, cheveux gras
2003: Julie Bertuccelli for Since Otar Left
2004: Éléonore Faucher and Gaëlle Macé for A Common Thread
2005: Karin Albou for Little Jerusalem
2006: Julie Gavras for Blame It on Fidel
2007: Marc Fitoussi for La Vie d'artiste
2008: Jean-Stéphane Sauvaire for Johnny Mad Dog
2009: Léa Fehner for Silent Voice
2010: Alix Delaporte for Angel & Tony
2011: Delphine and Muriel Coulin for 17 Girls
2012: Rachid Djaïdani for Hold Back
2013: Guillaume Gallienne for Me, Myself and Mum
2014: Jeanne Herry for Elle l'adore
2015: Thomas Bidegain for The Cowboys
2016: Ludovic Boukherma, Zoran Boukherma, Marielle Gautier and Hugo P. Thomas for Willy 1er
2017: Léonor Serraille for Jeune Femme
2020: Charlène Favier for Slalom
2021:  Vincent Maël Cardona for Les Magnetiques.
2022: Charlotte Le Bon for Falcon Lake

Prix de la Révélation 
The Revelation Prize recognises an original work by a promising new filmmaker and is awarded by a Revelation jury composed of up-and-coming actors and filmmakers.

2006: Half Nelson by Ryan Fleck
2007: Rocket Science by Jeffrey Blitz
2008: Ballast by Lance Hammer
2009: The Messenger by Oren Moverman
2010: Holy Rollers by Kevin Asch
2011: Detachment by Tony Kaye
2012: Beasts of the Southern Wild by Benh Zeitlin
2013: Fruitvale Station by Ryan Coogler
2014: A Girl Walks Home Alone at Night by Ana Lily Amirpour
2015: James White by Josh Mond
2016: Wiener-Dog by Todd Solondz
2017: A Ghost Story by David Lowery
2020 : The Nest by Sean Durkin
2021: John and the Hole by Pascual Sisto
2022: War Pony by Gina Gammell and Riley Keough

Prix du Scénario
The Screenplay Prize was awarded in 2004, 2005 and 2006, and then discontinued.

 2004: The Final Cut by Omar Naim
 2005: Transamerica by Duncan Tucker
 2006: Sherrybaby by Laurie Collyer

The Jury
 1995 : Andrei Konchalovsky (president), Anouk Aimée, Michael Lonsdale, Claudie Ossard, René Bonnell, Valérie Kaprisky, Steven Zaillian, Mathilda May, Élie Chouraqui and Yvan Attal.
 1996 : Charlotte Rampling (president), Sabine Azéma, René Cleitman, Dominique Farrugia, Charlotte Gainsbourg, Chiara Mastroianni, Laura Morante, Ornella Muti, Melvil Poupaud and Alain Rocca.
 1997 : Sophie Marceau (president), Élodie Bouchez, Philippe Carcassonne, Étienne Chatiliez, Alain Finkielkraut, John Hurt, Michèle Laroque, Inés Sastre, Nathalie Quintane and Lambert Wilson.
 1998 : Jean-Paul Rappeneau (president), Michèle Halberstadt, Sandrine Kiberlain, Virginie Ledoyen, Russell Banks, Maurice Bernart, Alessandro Gassmann, Ewan McGregor, Liam Neeson, Éric Serra and Christian Vincent (director).
 1999 : Régis Wargnier (president), Jean-Hugues Anglade, Humbert Balsan, Richard Berry, Gabriel Byrne, Jean-Pierre Dionnet, Marie Gillain, Michel Houellebecq, Marie-France Pisier and Elsa Zylberstein.
 2000 : Neil Jordan (president), Guillaume Canet, Clotilde Courau, Tchéky Karyo, Philippe Labro, Samuel Le Bihan, François Ozon, Vincent Perez, Danièle Thompson and Marie Trintignant.
 2001 : Jean-Jacques Annaud (president), Sandrine Bonnaire, Marion Cotillard, Arielle Dombasle, Gérard Darmon, Jean-Pierre Jeunet, Darius Khondji, Benoît Poelvoorde and Gabriel Yared.
 2002 : Pierre Lescure (president), Chantal Akerman, Richard Anconina, Jean-Marc Barr, Charles Berling, Amira Casar, Julie Gayet, Irène Jacob, Cédric Kahn and Bruno Wolkowitch.
 2003 : Roman Polanski (president), Claudia Cardinale, Paweł Edelman, Jacques Fieschi, Ben Kingsley, Anne Parillaud, Zbigniew Preisner, Ludivine Sagnier, Fernando Trueba and Tom Tykwer.
 2004 : Claude Lelouch (president), Anouk Aimée, Marie-Josée Croze, Danièle Heymann, Diane Kurys, Jeanne Labrune, Lio, Claudie Ossard, Bettina Rheims and Mathilde Seigner.
 2005 : Alain Corneau (president), Enki Bilal, Dominique Blanc, Romane Bohringer, Rachida Brakni, Christophe, Dominik Moll, Melvil Poupaud and Brigitte Roüan.
 2006 : Nicole Garcia (president), Maurice Barthélémy, Guillaume Canet, Amira Casar, Emmanuelle Castro, Antoine de Caunes, Julien Clerc, Philippe Djian and Marthe Keller.
 2007 : André Téchiné (president), Odile Barski, Xavier Beauvois, Nicolas Cazalé, Charlélie Couture, Émilie Deleuze, Anouk Grinberg and Marie-France Pisier.
 2008 : Carole Bouquet (president), Édouard Baer, Ronit Elkabetz, Diane Fleri, Pierre Jolivet, Cédric Kahn, Cristian Mungiu, Leonor Silveira and Dean Tavoularis.
 2009 : Jean-Pierre Jeunet (president), Hiam Abbass, Dany Boon, Jean-Loup Dabadie, Émilie Dequenne, Déborah François, Sandrine Kiberlain, Patrice Leconte, Géraldine Pailhas and Bruno Podalydès.
 2010 : Emmanuelle Béart (president), Lucas Belvaux, Jeanne Balibar, Faouzi Bensaïdi, Christine Citti, Fabrice Du Welz, Tony Gatlif, Denis Lavant and Abderrahmane Sissako.
 2011 : Olivier Assayas (president), Nathalie Baye, Claire Denis, Nicolas Godin, Chiara Mastroianni, Angelin Preljocaj, Jean Rolin et Bruno Todeschini.
 2012 : Sandrine Bonnaire (president), Clotilde Courau, Sami Bouajila, Christophe Honoré, Anaïs Demoustier, Alice Taglioni, Philippe Decouflé, Joann Sfar and Florent Emilio Siri.
 2013 : Vincent Lindon (president), Lou Doillon, Jean Echenoz, Hélène Fillières, Xavier Giannoli, Famke Janssen, Pierre Lescure, Bruno Nuytten and Rebecca Zlotowski.
 2014 : Costa-Gavras (president), Jean-Pierre Jeunet, Claude Lelouch, Pierre Lescure, Vincent Lindon, André Téchiné, Marie-Claude Pietragalla
 2015 : Benoît Jacquot (president), Pascal Bonitzer, Louise Bourgoin, Louis-Do de Lencquesaing, Marc Dugain, Marie Gillain, Julien Hirsch, Sophie Fillières and Marthe Keller
 2016 : Frédéric Mitterrand (president), Françoise Arnoul, Éric Elmosnino, Sara Forestier, Ana Girardot, Douglas Kennedy, Radu Mihăileanu, Emmanuel Mouret and Marjane Satrapi
 2017: Michel Hazanavicius (president), Benjamin Biolay, Emmanuelle Devos, Clotilde Hesme, Eric Lartigau, Charlotte Le Bon, Michel Leclerc, Yasmina Reza, Axelle Ropert and Alice Winocour
 2018 : Sandrine Kiberlain (president), Sabine Azéma, Alex Beaupain, Leïla Bekhti, Stéphane Brizé, Sara Giraudeau, Xavier Legrand, Pierre Salvadori, Leïla Slimani
 2019 : Catherine Deneuve (president), Antonin Baudry, Claire Burger, Jean-Pierre Duret, Valeria Golino, Vicky Krieps, Gaël Morel, Orelsan, Nicolas Saada, Gaspard Ulliel
 2020 : Vanessa Paradis (president), Yann Gonzalez, Zita Hanrot, Delphine Horvilleur, Vincent Lacoste, Mounia Meddour, Sylvie Pialat, Brunot Podalydès, Oxmo Puccino
 2021 : Charlotte Gainsbourg (president), Bertrand Bonello, Delphine de Vigan, Denis Podalydès, Fatou N'Diaye, Garance Marillier, Mikhaël Hers, SebastiAn

The Revelation Jury 
2006: Christophe Honoré (president), Lou Doillon, Audrey Marnay, Olivier Py, Émilie Simon and Gilles Taurand
2007: Gaël Morel (president), Clotilde Hesme, Olivia Magnani, Mélanie Thierry and Florian Zeller
2008: Zoe Cassavetes (president), Diastème, Léa Drucker, Jalil Lespert and Ara Starck
2009: Maïwenn (president), Romane Bohringer, Nicolas Fargues, Aïssa Maïga, Louise Monot and Raphaël
2010: Manuel Pradal (president), Jonathan Lambert, Emma Luchini, Roxane Mesquida and Sébastien Thiéry
2011: Samuel Benchetrit (president), Leila Hatami, Sabrina Ouazani, Elisa Sednaoui and Benjamin Siksou
2012: Frédéric Beigbeder (president), Àstrid Bergès-Frisbey, Mélanie Bernier, Ana Girardot and Félix Moati
2013: Valérie Donzelli (president), Laurence Arné, Vincent Lacoste, Géraldine Maillet and Woodkid
2014: Audrey Dana (president), Anne Berest, Lola Bessis, Christine and the Queens, Freddie Highmore and Clémence Poésy
2015: Zabou Breitman (president), Alice Isaaz, Géraldine Nakache, Stanley Weber and Rachelle Lefevre
2016: Audrey Pulvar (president), Cédric Anger, Jérôme Bonnell, Kheiron, Diane Rouxel and Christa Théret
2017: Emmanuelle Bercot (president), Abd al Malik, Anaïs Demoustier, Pio Marmaï, Pierre Rochefort and Leonor Varela

See also

Deauville Asian Film Festival

References

Further reading
Roland Godefroy, Deauville, 25 ans de cinéma américain, éd. CID, 2000

External links
Official website
Deauville Festival – the official website of France 

1975 establishments in France
Film festivals in France
Deauville
Cinema of the United States
France–United States relations
Tourist attractions in Calvados (department)
Film festivals established in 1975